Nobeoka Nishishina Athletic Stadium is an athletic stadium in Nobeoka, Miyazaki, Japan.

References
Nobeoka City Site

Football venues in Japan
Sports venues in Miyazaki Prefecture
Nobeoka, Miyazaki
Honda Lock SC
Sports venues completed in 1968
1968 establishments in Japan